Allium chinense (also known as Chinese onion, Chinese scallion, glittering chive, Japanese scallion, Kiangsi scallion, and Oriental onion) is an edible species of Allium, native to China, and cultivated in many other countries. Its close relatives include the onion, shallot, leek, chive, and garlic.

Distribution
Allium chinense is native to China (in Anhui, Fujian, Guangdong, Guangxi, Guizhou, Hainan, Henan, Hubei, Hunan, Jiangxi, and Zhejiang provinces). It is naturalized in other parts of Asia as well as in North America.

Uses

Culinary
Owing to its very mild and "fresh" taste, A. chinense is often pickled and served as a side dish in Japan and Vietnam to balance the stronger flavor of some other component in a meal. For example, in Japanese cuisine, it is eaten as a garnish on Japanese curry.

In Vietnam, pickled A. chinense, known as củ kiệu, is often served during Tết (Lunar New Year).

Glass bottles of white rakkyō bulb pickles are sold in Asian supermarkets in North America.

Medicinal
Allium chinense is used as a folk medicine in tonics to help the intestines, and as a stomachic.

See also

References

External links

 Botanical drawing of Allium chinense at Tropicos.org
 
 

chinense
Asian vegetables
Chinese pickles
Crops originating from China
Edible plants
Garden plants
Japanese pickles
Onions
Vegetables
Vietnamese cuisine